The Leith, later Leith-Buchanan Baronetcy, of Burgh St Peter in the County of Norfolk, is a title in the Baronetage of Great Britain. It was created on 21 November 1775 for Alexander Leith, Member of Parliament for Tregony. The third Baronet married Jemima, daughter of Hector Macdonald Buchanan. Their son the fourth Baronet assumed the additional surname of Buchanan in 1877. Neither the presumed seventh Baronet nor eighth Baronet successfully proved their succession and were not on the Official Roll of the Baronetage. Following the death of the 8th Baronet in a motor vehicle accident in 2018, the title passed to his son, the 9th Baronet; he also has not proven his claim to the title.

The Leith family is of Scottish origin and descends from William Leith, Provost of Aberdeen in the 14th century.

Leith, later Leith-Buchanan baronets, of Burgh St Peter (1775)
Sir Alexander Leith, 1st Baronet (1741–1780)
Sir George Alexander William Leith, 2nd Baronet (–1842)
Sir Alexander William Wellesley Leith, 3rd Baronet (1806–1842)
Sir George Hector Leith-Buchanan, 4th Baronet (1833–1903)
Sir Alexander Wellesley George Thomas Leith-Buchanan, 5th Baronet (1866–1925)
Sir George Hector Macdonald Leith-Buchanan, 6th Baronet (1889–1973)
Charles Alexander James Leith-Buchanan, presumed 7th Baronet (1939–1998)
Gordon Kelly McNicol Leith-Buchanan, presumed 8th Baronet (1974–2018)
Scott Kelly Leith-Buchanan, presumed 9th Baronet (born 2010)

Notes

References
Kidd, Charles, Williamson, David (editors). Debrett's Peerage and Baronetage (1990 edition). New York: St Martin's Press, 1990, 

Leith-Buchanan
1775 establishments in Great Britain